Matthew Parr may refer to:
Matthew Parr (figure skater) (born 1990), British figure skater
Matthew Parr (racing driver) (born 1986), racing driver
Matt Parr (born 1962), Royal Navy officer